Lyubov Kharlamova, née Ivanova (born 2 March 1981) is a Russian long-distance runner who specializes in the 3000 metres steeplechase.

She finished fourth at the 2006 European Athletics Championships in Gothenburg and  fourth at the 2006 IAAF World Athletics Final, but tested positive in a doping test for a steroid and received a two-year doping ban.

She finished third in the 2010 European Athletics Championships – Women's 3000 metres steeplechase but on 18 August 2017 the Court of Arbitration for Sport (CAS) announced that Kharlamova had been disqualified for doping offences following retesting.

Personal bests
 1500 metres – 4:11.49 min (2003)
 3000 metres – 9:11.34 min (2004)
 3000 metres steeplechase – 9:21.94 min (2006)

See also
List of doping cases in athletics
List of stripped European Athletics Championships medals

References

 

1981 births
Living people
Russian female long-distance runners
Russian female steeplechase runners
World Athletics Championships athletes for Russia
European Athletics Championships medalists
Russian Athletics Championships winners
Doping cases in athletics
Russian sportspeople in doping cases